Allison Calder (2 April 1960 – 10 October 2002) was a former swimming representative from New Zealand. She competed at the 1976 Summer Olympics and the 1974 Commonwealth Games. Calder was one of a number of swimming stars coached under Duncan Laing in Dunedin.

Career
Calder swum at the 1974 Commonwealth Games in Christchurch, New Zealand. Calder raced in the 200m, 400m and 800m Freestyle with her best finish being a 6th in the 800m Freestyle. Calder also was part of the 4x100 Freestyle Relay which finished in 5th place.

As a sixteen-year-old, Calder attended the 1976 Olympics held in Montreal where she placed 11th in the 800m Freestyle and 15th in the 400m Freestyle.

References

External links
 

1960 births
2002 deaths
New Zealand female swimmers
Olympic swimmers of New Zealand
Swimmers at the 1976 Summer Olympics
Swimmers from Dunedin
Swimmers at the 1974 British Commonwealth Games
Commonwealth Games competitors for New Zealand